is a double-A side single released by artist Dohzi-T. The main song is a collaboration song with Beni. The song sold over 2,000,000 ringtone downloads and was later released as a single. The single managed to reach the number seven spot weekly on the Oricon ranking and was a long charting hit selling over 80,000 copies. The single is ranked as #93 on the yearly Oricon chart.

Track listing
 Mō Ichi do... (feat. Beni)
 One Love feat. Shota Shimizu ('08 ver.)
Mō Ichi do... (Instrumental)
 One Love (Instrumental)

References

2008 singles
Beni (singer) songs
2008 songs
Song articles with missing songwriters